Alter do Chão is one of the administrative districts of the city of Santarém, in Pará state located on the right bank of the Tapajós. The distance to the city center about 37 kilometres across the highway Everaldo Martins (PA-457). It is the main tourist spot of Santarém, it houses the most beautiful freshwater beach in the world according to the British newspaper The Guardian, and is popularly known as the Brazilian Caribbean.

Etymology

The name is a tribute to the Portuguese town of Alter do Chão.

History
Founded on March 6, 1626, by Portuguese Pedro Teixeira, it was elevated to a town by Francisco Xavier de Mendonça Furtado, governor of the State of Grão-Pará and Maranhão, during Colonial Brazil, on March 6, 1758.

Alter do Chão, during the 17th century and 18th century, received several religious missions, led by the Jesuits of the Franciscan order. The cult of Our Lady of Remedies was established. This became the patron saint of this holy place.

Until the 18th century, the village was inhabited mostly by indigenous communities Boraris. It still has traces of the natives because of the existence of several sites with many pottery shards, pipes, and polished stone axes.

In the early 20th century, Alter do Chao was one of the transportation routes of latex extracted from rubber trees Belterra and Fordlandia. It was a short period of development for the town. In the 1950s the decay of Amazonian extraction began, and the village was hit by the economic deficit. From the 1990s to the present day, the district focuses on tourism to evolve economically, which has achieved good results.

Tourism 
Tourism in Alter do Chão is more appropriate from August to December. When the waters subside, one can visit the freshwater beaches.

Sairé Festival 
Sairé is the most traditional popular festival in the Amazon rainforest.

The Festa do Sairé in Alter do Chão, mixes Catholic religious elements with expressions of local culture for locals and tourists. It is held every September.

There are processions, Caiibó groups, and dramatizations of Amazonian legends, such as the legend of the boto.

Finally, there is an amusing dispute between the Cor de Rosa and Tucuxi dolphins, groups with allegories, songs and costumes, such as the samba schools.

The Festival dos Botos was incorporated into Sairé in the 1970s and resembles the Festival dos Bois de Parintins (AM).

References

Populated places in Pará